John "Rod" Humenuik (born June 17, 1938) is an American former gridiron football player and coach. He served as the head football coach at California State University, Northridge from 1971 to 1972 and Principia College in Elsah, Illinois from 1998 to 2002, compiling a career college football record of 10–12.

Humenuik attended Los Angeles High School in Los Angeles, where was named an All-City tackle in 1954. He began his college football career at Pierce College in Los Angeles, earning All-Western State Conference laurels and honorable mention on All-American Junior College team in 1955. Humenuik transferred to the University of Southern California, earning letters for the USC Trojans football team in 1956 and 1957. The then played professionally with the Winnipeg Blue Bombers in the Canadian Football League (CFL).

Humenuik began his coaching career in 1963 when he was hired as line coach at La Habra High School in La Habra, California. He served in the same role at  Long Beach Polytechnic High School in Long Beach, California the following year before moving to Fullerton College in 1965, once again serving as line coach. Humenuik returned to USC in 1966 as an assistant coach under John McKay.

Head coaching record

References

1938 births
Living people
American football tackles
American players of Canadian football
Cal State Northridge Matadors football coaches
Cleveland Browns coaches
Detroit Fury coaches
Frankfurt Galaxy coaches
Fullerton Hornets football coaches
Kansas State Wildcats football coaches
London Monarchs coaches
National Football League offensive coordinators
New England Patriots coaches
New York Jets coaches
Pierce Brahmas football players
Principia Panthers football coaches
Toronto Argonauts coaches
USC Trojans football coaches
California State University, Northridge faculty
Principia College faculty
USC Trojans football players
Winnipeg Blue Bombers players
High school football coaches in California
Los Angeles High School alumni
Coaches of American football from California
Players of American football from Los Angeles
Players of American football from Detroit
Players of Canadian football from Los Angeles
Sportspeople from Detroit
Sports coaches from Los Angeles